Clicked Singles Best 13 is a compilation album released by L'Arc-en-Ciel on March 14, 2001. As the title suggests, it collects previously released singles, with the addition of a new track, "Anemone" (written and composed by vocalist Hyde). There are several alternative editions to the one released in Japan, which have either differently ordered or additional tracks. Reached the top of Oricon Albums Chart.

Track listing

Personnel
 Hyde – vocals
 Ken – guitar
 Tetsu – bass guitar, backing vocals
 Sakura/Yukihiro – drums

References

2001 greatest hits albums
L'Arc-en-Ciel albums